Secret is the eighth studio album by Japanese singer-songwriter Ayumi Hamasaki, released November 29, 2006 by Avex Trax. As with all of her previous works, Hamasaki wrote all of the lyrics on Secret. The album's composition was handled largely by Dai Nagao and Tetsuya Yukumi, both of whom were frequent collaborators with Hamasaki. Generally a rock-pop influenced album, Hamasaki said that the meaning of the album was itself a secret, and that it incorporated secrets she was keeping about herself that the public did not know.

Secret had been announced originally as a seven-track EP; however, it eventually evolved into a fourteen-track album. "Startin'/Born to Be..." was released as the lead single from Secret on March 8, 2006. It debuted at the number-one position in Japan, becoming Hamasaki's twenty-sixth chart topper; with this, she became the female singer with the most number-one singles in Japan, breaking Seiko Matsuda's record. However, it would sell poorly thereafter, charting for fifteen weeks and selling under 200,000 copies. "Blue Bird" would have more success: it topped the charts in Japan and was certified Platinum for shipments of 250,000 copies. With "Blue Bird", which sold around 300,000 copies, Hamasaki became the first solo artist in Japan to sell over 20 million singles.

Secret received positive reviews from critics, who praised its rock influences and thought that every song stood well enough on its own, but felt that it "failed to leave a clear impression" as a cohesive record. The album won Album of the Year at the Japan Gold Disc Awards; its title track received "Japanese Song of the Year" at the RTHK International Awards in Hong Kong. Secret debuted at number one in Japan with first week sales of 386,280 copies. It would go on to become the 22nd best selling album of 2006 in Japan, and the 73rd best seller of 2007, selling 675,400 copies in its 15-week chart run and receiving a triple-platinum certification for having 750,000 copies shipped to stores. Despite this success, Secret would become her lowest-selling album at that point and her first to not to be certified Million. According to Avex, Secret has sold 900,000 copies worldwide.

Title
Hamasaki on an interview stated that the reason behind naming the album 'Secret' was that the album literally was a secret. She said it was named so that people might think "That's one of her secrets". She also said she wanted to feel when they hear a song, they should think they knew her secret. The album's lyrics reinforce the understanding others, rather than just yourself, as she states:

But it's not a secret in the sense that "I'm about to disclose something you didn't know!" Instead, it could be about "me" in my daily life, or it could be about you… Everyone keeps secrets; there is not one person on this planet who does not have at least one secret, nor is there a person who can tell others everything about him or herself. Even when you try to understand others (or to have a mutual understanding with others), there is always a "you" that only you know about. I have aspects that only certain people know about and aspects that everyone knows about. That's what I call a secret. And in this sense, there are secrets incorporated into this album.

Production
Originally, Secret was announced to be a seven-track mini-album. After announcing that Secret was to become a full album on her official website, a message from Hamasaki on her TeamAyu fanclub website stated that she was doing overtime in the studio in order to complete the album on time.

Hamasaki stated that "Until that Day..." was originally intended to be an instrumental track composed by CMJK. She loved the sound of the guitar and the b-melody and thus asked him to compose it into a full-length track. From the beginning, she knew just what she had in mind to write about. She admitted to having difficulty matching her emotions with the complex melody of the song so she sat down at home and compiled a list of synonyms of key words and eventually finished the song. Although she tried to keep the song positive, it sparked feelings of heartbrokenness upon revealing it to her staff.

The third track, "Startin'", was recorded in New York City. According to Hamasaki, the sound in the studio made it easy for her to sing despite the challenge in vocals that she gave herself by choosing to sing in this particular style. Hamasaki stated that even though the song is generally perceived as a song for dancing on stage with dancers, it was originally intended to be a band-only song. She enjoyed her recording session, commenting that what really brought out the new vocal style was doing the recording in the New York studio with its great sound and atmosphere.

"Momentum", the eighth track on the album, took Hamasaki a total of four days to record. This is the longest amount of time she has ever taken to record a song in her whole career. Usually, she goes into the booth and records a song very quickly, but with "Momentum" she had been spending so much time in the recording booth that she felt like she might as well have slept there. Hamasaki stated that listening to the song now makes her remember the strenuous recording and brings her to tears.

The album's title track, "Secret", was the last song to be recorded for the album. Since she had so much strain with recording "Momentum", Ayumi vowed to complete the recording for "Secret" in one go. However, by doing this she put great pressure on herself and made herself quite nervous. She had considered forgetting the song and leaving the studio several times due to the stress from her pressure and the extreme time limit to have the song recorded, but she decided to simply give it her all and do her best.

By finishing this song, she had completed the recordings for the entire album. Hamasaki stated that she was almost in tears with the staff members because she actually managed to extend this album from a seven-track mini-album into a full length fourteen-track studio album in a matter of weeks.

On November 6, 2006, recording for the album was wrapped. On November 7, the track list and both the CD-only and CD+DVD covers were released. Secret is Hamasaki's first album to be produced and sold in Malaysia.

Promotion
During November and December 2006, Hamasaki performed live on Japanese TV shows eleven times. The main promotional track of the album was 'Jewel', which was performed live on Japanese TV eleven times, three times in which a special orchestra version of the song was performed. Jewel was also released as a ringtone, where it went on to be certified triple platinum, meaning it was downloaded over 750,000 times. "1 Love" was also performed once. Hamasaki was featured on the cover of seven Japanese magazines during the promotion of Secret. These magazines were "Sweet", "Bea's Up", "Vivi", "Popteen", "Cawaii!", "S Cawaii", and another edition of "Vivi". Hamasaki was also a guest on two major radio shows during the release of the album; All Night Nippon and DoCoMo Hits from the Heart. This album was highly promoted and sold many copies throughout Asia.

TV performances
 March 3, 2006–Music Fighter–"Startin'"
 March 10, 2006–Music Station–"Born to Be..."
 March 10, 2006–Music Fighter–"Born to Be..."
 March 11, 2006–CDTV–"Startin'"
 June 11, 2006–Domoto Kyodai–"Blue Bird"
 June 16, 2006–Music Station–"Blue Bird"
 June 23, 2006–Music Fighter–"Blue Bird"
 June 23, 2006–Music Station–"Blue Bird"
 June 24, 2006–CDTV–"Blue Bird"
 June 25, 2006–Avex Shareholders Meeting–"Blue Bird"
 October 13, 2006–Music Station Fall Special–"Jewel"
 November 13, 2006–Hey! Hey! Hey!–"Jewel"
 November 24, 2006–Music Station–"Jewel"
 November 24, 2006–Music Fighter–"Jewel"
 November 29, 2006–3,000,000 Choose Best Artist 2006–"Jewel (Orchestra Version)"
 December 1, 2006–Music Station–"Jewel (Orchestra Version)"
 December 6, 2006–FNS–"Jewel (Orchestra Version)"
 December 8, 2006–PopJam–"Jewel"
 December 22, 2006–Music Station Super Live–"Jewel"
 December 24, 2006–Happy X-Mas Show 2006–"Jewel"
 December 31, 2006–57th Kouhaku–"Jewel"
 December 31, 2006–CDTV Special Live 2006-2007–"1 Love"

Music videos
There are a total of 7 music videos (or PVs) on the album. In order of release, they are "Startin'", "Born to Be...", "Blue Bird", "Beautiful Fighters", "Jewel", "Momentum", and "1 Love".

The PVs for Startin, Born to Be, Blue Bird, Beautiful Fighters and Momentum were all directed by Takahide Ishii.

The video for Startin' has a lighter and comical tone than the other PVs of the album which have a consistently deeper tone. It starts off with two young male friends in a video store. They are conversing when suddenly, Hamasaki drills a hole through the brick wall and comes in. She dances and rejects one of them who makes an advance on her, and points a finger at the other man which shocks him. In the next scene, she is riding a motorcycle in a sports suit, and initiates a little "race" with a Hummer like vehicle with three passengers. She points a finger at them, which shocks the three passengers as well. She then stands up while driving her motorcycle and suddenly jumps off while the motorcycle crashes into a building, causing an explosion. The motorcycle scene has been criticised for being similar to the music video of Britney Spears' Toxic, but looks similar and her look is more recognizable to the brief motorcycle scene in Kill Bill Vol. 1. Hamasaki lands safely and walks away. In the end, it goes back to the video store (in the state before Hamasaki came in) with the two friends conversing. One complains that it is hot in the building and takes off a mask, revealing it to be Hamasaki. Segments of dancing are also present throughout the PV, in between scenes. One is on a platform, while the other dancing scenes are in a dark, desert like setting, similar to "Work It", and the style of dancing is also similar to the dancing in the "Work It" video. This song was used as the opening song for the videogame "Onimusha: Dawn of Dreams" of Capcom for the PlayStation 2.

The PV for Born To Be... had thematic ties to the 2006 Winter Olympics in Turin, Italy, which TV channel Nittele promoted using "Born To Be...". Hamasaki is standing and singing in front of bright orange/yellow lights in a dark room which change brightness. In effect, sometimes the viewer cannot see much due to the brightness and sometimes they cannot see much due to the darkness. There is a band playing in the water (in the same setting), and an aerobic dancer also performs in the water. Later, people of all ethnicities around the world, mostly children, are individually projected against a white wall stating what they would like to be when they grow up. Since their voices are not heard due to the song, they have visual aids. (For example, a girl is speaking in an ice skating uniform, holding a pair of ice skates). Hamasaki also appears on this backdrop, saying something although it cannot be heard.

The "Blue Bird" PV (music video) officially aired on SpaceShower TV on June 9, 2006. In the first scene, she is singing on an empty beach. She is then seen on a boat with friends (many of whom are featured in her Fairyland PV, while they are in fact her dance team members). Throughout the video, it switches between the first setting, the second setting, and a third setting in which she is feasting and having fun with the same friends. There is also a fourth setting where she sings on a cliff. The PV was filmed in Guam.

The Beautiful Fighters PV officially aired on SpaceShower TV on June 12, 2006. In the first scene, fans anticipate entering what looks to be an arena, while three dancers stand outside the door. The fans rush in to watch Ayumi and a group of dancers atop a stage dancing and standing on multi-colored cars. The video switches between scenes of the five female dancers' stories of misfortune at different jobs. The dancers are shown as a delivery person, a waitress, a pool-cleaner, and a painter; Ayumi plays as a cashier at a mart. At the end, each person involved in the dancers' mess-up is shown dancing in the crowd and then each of the dancers, along with Ayumi, circles the stage in her own car.

The music video for "Jewel", directed by Wataru Takeishi, is one of the most expensive music videos ever made, allegedly costing over 100 million yen (nearly $1 million USD) to produce. It is basically composed by scenes featuring Hamasaki adorned in diamonds at a winter-like set. It was leaked online November 24, 2006.

The PV for "Momentum" first aired on MTV on November 28, 2006 in the morning and the music video shows ayumi as a ghost, but a ghost which people can see and in the music video she sings in the snow and cold, while people look at her through opened windows, In the end of the video, a man put flowers on her grave, ayumi then sees him and she melts away. There were also in-ter cut scenes of ayumi in a room full of candles.

The PV for "1 Love"  was first played on Headliner on November 27, 2006 and features an underground human bid, where rich people (covered with venetian masks) buy human beings who are slaves and supposedly have special abilities, like a monster, an eat-it-all man, a prostitute, an otaku, and Hamasaki herself, who appears singing and pole-dancing. She is also seen in a cage, and later on tries to escape, covering herself with one of the masks, just to be found by the owner of the bid, a circus-master like man.

Tour

Upon her explosive release of Secret throughout Asia, Hamasaki launched her first ever international tour. Entitled "Asia Tour 2007 ~Tour of Secret~", the tour reached various countries and territories throughout Asia such as Japan, China, Taiwan, and Hong Kong. As with most of Hamasaki's tours, most of the tickets were sold out within minutes. The tickets also sold surprisingly well in Asia. Tickets were sold out to the Taiwan concert in less than two hours. Similarly, tickets were sold out in less than three hours in Hong Kong and in within six hours in Shanghai To promote the album, Hamasaki performed many hit songs from "Secret". This also marked the beginning of her use of the English language at her concerts and press conferences in which she used the language to communicate fluently with fans and media.

Tie-ups and theme songs
The album's first single "Startin' / Born to Be..." was used as the opening theme song for Capcom's video game Onimusha: Dawn of Dreams. It is the standard theme song in the Japanese version of the game and can also be heard in the International version if the game language is set to Japanese in the settings menu. It was also used in a commercial advertisement for Japanese music downloading service Mu-Mo.

"Born to Be" was a special song used as the theme song for Japan's coverage of the 2006 Winter Olympics in Turin, Italy. The song was written especially for the occasion and this can be apparent in the style of the song as well as its lyrics. It was also used in a Mu-mo advert.

Hamasaki's summer single "Blue Bird" was used in a promotional campaign for Zespri Golden Kiwis. The use of Hamasaki's song in advertisements boosted sales so much that Zespri launched a special press conference to thank her. The song was also used in advertisements for Japanese music downloading services Dwango and Mu-mo.

"Beautiful Fighters" was used in a commercial advertisement promoting Panasonic's D-Snap portable audio player. Hamasaki appeared playing tennis while using the product in its commercial to demonstrate the portability of the audio player.

"Jewel" was used in a commercial for Panasonic's Lumix FX07 digital camera. Hamasaki appeared in the commercial wearing a traditional Japanese wedding gown as well as various coloured cocktail dresses. It was also used in a Mu-mo advertisement.

"1 Love" was used as in a commercial for Panasonic's D-Snap portable audio player. Hamasaki appeared in the commercial using the products while riding on the subway. The commercial demonstrated the noise-cancelling abilities of the product. It was also used in another Panasonic commercial for the D-Dock. Upon the launch of the Lumix FX07 and the D-Snap and D-Dock audio players, Hamasaki appeared as Panasonic's spokesperson at a press conference in Tokyo.

The album's title track "Secret" was used as the theme song for Hong Kong film Confession of Pain.www.confessionofpain.com Hamasaki attended the movie premiere in Hong Kong. That song can also be found on the single Glitter / Fated and is Hamasaki's first song on its original form to be released on a single after it was featured in an album.

Track listing

Charts

Album

 Total Sales: 710,000 (Japan)
 Total Sales: 860,000 (Avex)

Chart information
Secret debuted at the top spot of the Oricon weekly chart with first week sales of 386,280 copies, outselling the number two album for a large 160,129 copies. However, its first week sales are about 263,000 lower than her last studio album (Miss)understood showed. This is because the "first week sales" of (Miss)understood were actually the sales of two weeks, as Oricon blends the last week of a year with the first one of the following year, making an Oricon Year with 51 weeks only. The same rule applies for the first week sales of her I Am... album. On the Oricon chart, Secret failed to surpass the one-million mark, making it her second album to not do so (the first being (Miss)understood). However, while (Miss)understood still managed to surpass the one-million mark in accordance to Avex, Secret failed to do so, selling only 900,000 copies.

The singles of this album together sold a total of 447,177 copies. The sales of the singles and the album itself combined come to a sales revenue of 1,314,551 CDs sold.

Secret is also believed to be Ayu's most successful album yet in worldwide sales. Not only did Secret top the Japanese charts, the album was an instant number-1 hit in countries as Taiwan, Singapore, Hong Kong,  and China.

In Japan, Secret charted for 18 weeks.

Physical sales charts

Singles

 Total single sales: 520,000
 Total album and single sales: 1,230,000

Release history

See also
 Tour of Secret
 Glitter / Fated (which contains title track "Secret", the B-side of the single)
 Kiss or Kill, the movie which the track "Kiss o' Kill" was named after.
 List of most expensive music videos (For the music video of Jewel)

References

External links
 Oricon
 Oricon Music Special 
 HMV Hong Kong Asian Chart
 HMV Hong Kong Japanese Chart
 g-music charts 

Ayumi Hamasaki albums
2006 albums
Avex Group albums
Japanese-language albums